French and Saunders: Still Alive! is a 2008 tour by comedy duo Dawn French and Jennifer Saunders. They performed in the UK in February – May in 2008 and were at Drury Lane, London for a month. The tour continued to Australia in mid-2009. There were many positive reviews for the UK leg of the tour, yet most reviews on the Australian leg were poor and negative. The first leg of the show concluded in May 2008. The show ended 9 November, in London. Previously they have toured their comedy act / sketch show very rarely, with UK tours in 1990 & 2000.

The tour contained a selection of their favourite sketches, as well as new material written specifically for the tour. The show was directed by Hamish McColl, set design by Lez Brotherstone, lighting, video and visual effects by Willie Williams.

Sketch List

Act 1
Video Introduction – Grannies Go to the Show

The White Room
The Doctor
The Future
Family
Contraception
Dawn's Chocolate Hunt

Video Interlude – Madonna
White Room – Madonna

Video Interlude – Prickly Pear Farm
In Court

Video Interlude – Those Lucky Bitches, Joan and Jackie Collins!

Grannies (Born To Be Wild)
Grannies Go To Dancing (Video Transition)
Strictly Come Dancing

Act 2

Ab Fab
Memories – Cassie Broadway

Video Interlude – What Ever Happened To Baby Dawn?
Bideford Girls

Video Interlude – Jennifer Has A Marlene Day

Boarding School

Video Interlude – Catherine Zeta-Jones

Geraldine Visits
So Called 'Goddess of Comedy'
Thank You for the Music

Video Outro – French and Saunders Over The Years

Encore

Fat Dick Men3

Tour dates

Leg 1: United Kingdom 2008
•28 February – Blackpool
•1 March – Blackpool

•4 March – Manchester
•5 March – Manchester
•6 March – Manchester
•7 March – Manchester
•8 March – Manchester

•11 March – Sheffield

•12 March – Newcastle upon Tyne
•13 March – Newcastle upon Tyne

•14 March – Edinburgh
•15 March – Edinburgh

•18 March – Glasgow
•19 March – Glasgow

•20 March – Sunderland

•21 March – Aberdeen

•22 March  – Newcastle upon Tyne

•25 March – Brighton
•26 March – Brighton

•27 March – Sheffield

•28 March – Ipswich
•29 March – Ipswich

•1 April – Plymouth
•2 April – Plymouth

•3 April – Nottingham
•4 April – Nottingham
•5 April – Nottingham

•7 April – Bournemouth

•9 April – Cardiff
•10 April – Cardiff
•11 April – Cardiff
•12 April – Cardiff

•14 April – Southampton
•15 April – Southampton

•16 April – Liverpool
•17 April – Liverpool

•18 April – Harrogate

•19 April – Llandeilo

•21 April – Birmingham
•22 April – Birmingham
•23 April – Birmingham
•24 April – Birmingham
•25 April – Birmingham
•26 April – Birmingham

•27 April – Bristol
•28 April – Bristol
•29 April – Bristol
•20 April – Bristol

•2 May – Portsmouth

•3 May – Bournemouth

•5 May – Oxford
•6 May – Oxford
•7 May – Oxford

Leg 2: Australia 2009
•25 June – Newcastle
•26 June – Newcastle

•27 June – Canberra

•1 July – Sydney
•2 July – Sydney
•3 July – Sydney
•4 July – Sydney
•5 July – Sydney
•6 July – Sydney
•8 July – Sydney
•9 July – Sydney

•11 July – Brisbane
•12 July – Brisbane
•13 July – Brisbane

•15 July – Melbourne
•16 July – Melbourne
•17 July – Melbourne
•18 July – Melbourne
•19 July – Melbourne
•20 July – Melbourne

•23 July – Perth
•24 July – Perth
•25 July – Perth

•28 July – Adelaide
•29 July – Adelaide

Additional notes
•Two shows were performed on 4 July in Sydney.
•Two shows were performed on 12 July in Brisbane.
•Two shows were performed on 18 July in Melbourne, both shows at different venues.
•On 23 July in Perth, the show was performed at a different venue.
•Two shows were performed on 28 July in Adelaide, both shows at different venues.

Comedy tours